Kerala Tulu Academy is an organisation under Government of Kerala which opened in 2007. The purpose of the academy is to preserve and promote Tulu language, Tulu script, Tulu literature and Tulu culture. It is located in Hosangadi in Kasargod district, Kerala which has a considerable population of Tulu speakers, a language minority in the state. The academy was inaugurated by then Chief Minister V. S. Achuthanandan. The academy is planned to set up its office in Durgippalla near Hosangadi in Kasargod district, Kerala.

Umesh M Saliyan is the current president of the academy, with Vijayakumar Pavala as secretary.

References

Indic literature societies
2007 establishments in Kerala
Culture of Kerala
Organisations based in Kerala
Tulu language
State agencies of Kerala
Government agencies established in 2007